Island Airport may refer to:

 Alor Island Airport
 Barrow/Walney Island Airport
 Barter Island LRRS Airport
 Benguerra Island Airport
 Bird Island Airport
 Chatham Islands / Tuuta Airport
 Chios Island National Airport
 Christmas Island Airport
 Crow Island Airport
 Coco Island Airport
 Corn Island Airport
 Cyril E. King Airport
 Darby Island Airport
 Jekyll Island Airport
 Kasos Island Public Airport
 King Island Airport
 Long Island MacArthur Airport
 Lord Howe Island Airport
 Mackinac Island Airport
 Marco Island Airport
 McKinnon St. Simons Island Airport
 Merritt Island Airport
 Mores Island Airport
 Norfolk Island Airport
 Orcas Island Airport
 Pelee Island Airport
 Pine Island Airport
 Plum Island Airport
 Praslin Island Airport
 Skyros Island National Airport
 Syros Island National Airport
 Taiping Island Airport
 Tangier Island Airport
 Union Island Airport